Petelea is a commune in Mureș County, Transylvania, Romania that is composed of two villages: Habic (Hétbükk, meaning "Seven Beech Trees" in Hungarian) and Petelea. It has a population of 2977: 48.3% Roma, 48.2% Romanians and 2.5% Hungarians.

It is situated on the left bank of the river Mureș and it is traversed by two of its affluents: the Beica and the Habic.

Natives
 Virgil Bercea

See also 
 List of Hungarian exonyms (Mureș County)

References

Communes in Mureș County
Localities in Transylvania